The order Symphypleona is one of the three main groups of springtails (Collembola), tiny hexapods related to insects. When the springtails were still believed to be an order of insects, the Symphypleona were ranked as a suborder.

They can be best distinguished from the other springtail groups by their body shape. The Symphypleona are very round animals, almost spherical, and usually have long antennae. The Poduromorpha, by contrast, always have short legs and a plump body, but more oval in shape than the Symphypleona. The Entomobryomorpha are the slimmest springtails, some with long and some with short legs and antennae, but always with a very slender body.

Systematics 
The Symphypleona order was previously suggested to also contain family Neelidae, as a very apomorphic relative in the Sminthuridae superfamily. Phylogenetic studies however suggest Neelidae to be the only family of Neelipleona order.

Families 

The following is a list of the families within Symphypleona, grouped by superfamily. It includes extinct families known only from fossil remains.

 Superfamily Sminthuridoidea
 Family Mackenziellidae
 Family Sminthuridae

 Superfamily Katiannoidea
 Family Katiannidae
 Family Spinothecidae
 Family Arrhopalitidae
 Family Collophoridae

 Superfamily Sturmioidea
 Family Sturmiidae

 Superfamily Sminthuroidea
 Family Sminthuridae
 Family Bourletiellidae

 Superfamily Dicyrtomoidea
 Family Dicyrtomidae

References

External links 
 

Collembola